James Graeme is a singer and actor.

James Graeme is also the name of:

James Graeme (poet)

See also
James Graham (disambiguation)